Kondrashkino is a rural locality (a selo) and the administrative center of Kondrashkinskoye Rural Settlement, Kashirsky District, Voronezh Oblast, Russia. The population was 597 as of 2010. There are 7 streets.

Geography 
Kondrashkino is located 7 km east of Kashirskoye (the district's administrative centre) by road. Kashirskoye is the nearest rural locality.

References 

Rural localities in Kashirsky District, Voronezh Oblast